Abuzarabad may refer to:
Abuzarabad, Fars
Abuzarabad, Kerman
Abuzarabad, Lorestan